Lee Han-do (born 16 March 1994) is a South Korean professional footballer who plays as a centre-back for K League 2 club Busan IPark.

References

External links 
 

1994 births
Living people
South Korean footballers
K League 1 players
K League 2 players
Jeonbuk Hyundai Motors players
Gwangju FC players
Suwon Samsung Bluewings players
Busan IPark players
Association football defenders
People from Gimhae
Sportspeople from South Gyeongsang Province